Ghijasa may refer to one of two places in Sibiu County, Romania:

Ghijasa de Jos, a village in Nocrich Commune
Ghijasa de Sus, a village in Alțâna Commune